Andrew Smailes (21 May 1896 – 1978) was an English footballer who played as a left half. He made over 290 Football League appearances in the years after the First World War.

Career
Andy Smailes initially played as an inside forward for Blyth Spartans. Smailes joined Newcastle United for £300 in October 1919. Smailes joined Sheffield Wednesday for £1,500 in October 1922. Alex Raisbeck signed Smailes in October 1923 for Bristol City in an exchange deal with Billy Walker. Smailes moved on to Rotherham United in August 1929. After retiring Smailes spent 18 years as trainer at Rotherham United before succeeding Reg Freeman as manager in August 1952. Smailes resigned as manager of Rotherham United in October 1958. Smailes also managed Scarborough for two years.

Honours
with Bristol City
Football League Third Division South winner: 1926–27

References

1896 births
1978 deaths
Sportspeople from Northumberland
English footballers
Association football wing halves
Blyth Spartans A.F.C. players
Newcastle United F.C. players
Sheffield Wednesday F.C. players
Rotherham United F.C. players
Bristol City F.C. players
English Football League players
Northern Football League players
English football managers
Rotherham United F.C. managers
Scarborough F.C. managers